St. Croix 34 is a Mi'kmaq reserve located in Hants County, Nova Scotia.

It is administratively part of the Annapolis Valley First Nation.

Indian reserves in Nova Scotia
Communities in Hants County, Nova Scotia
Mi'kmaq in Canada